Haarlemmerliede is a small village in the Dutch province of North Holland.

Haarlemmerliede was a separate municipality between 1817 and 1857, when it merged with Spaarnwoude. The resulting municipality of Haarlemmerliede en Spaarnwoude was later merged with Haarlemmermeer, in 2019.

The statistical area "Haarlemmerliede", which also can include the surrounding countryside, has a population of around 300.

Notable residents 
Cornélie Huygens (1848 - 1902), writer, social democrat and feminist, was born in Haarlemmerliede.

References

Populated places in North Holland
Former municipalities of North Holland
Haarlemmermeer